Work People's College was a radical labor college (a type of a folk high school governed by the worker's movement) established in Smithville (Duluth), then a suburb of Duluth, Minnesota, in 1907 by the Finnish Socialist Federation of the Socialist Party of America. School administrators and faculty were sympathetic to the syndicalist left wing of the Finnish labor movement and the institution came into the orbit of the Industrial Workers of the World during the 1914-1915 factional battle that split the Finnish Federation. The school ceased operation in 1941.

In 2012 the Twin Cities branch of the Industrial Workers of the World relaunched Work People's College on a limited basis as a summer training camp for the group's activists and organizers.

Institutional history

Forerunner

Finnish immigrants to the United States during the first years of the 20th Century tended to be a literate community, with 97% of those arriving between 1899 ad 1907 knowing how to read and write. Education was a valued part of Finnish immigrant life and the desire for institutions of higher learning in their own language extended across generational and ideological boundaries. As early as 1900 there were discussions about establishing a school that would provide a liberal alternative to Suomi College and Seminary of Hancock, Michigan.

Work People's College was preceded by a "folk" high school of the Finnish Evangelical Lutheran Church of America that was founded in Minneapolis in September 1903. The school was launched with a view to teaching the Finnish language and Lutheran religion to its students. Finnish immigrants in this period constituted nearly 40 percent of the population of Northern Minnesota, with a goodly number of these working in the mining and timber industries or on the docks of Duluth, a major port on the southernmost tip of Lake Superior.

The Finnish Lutheran high school moved to Smithville, a rural area just southwest of Duluth, a few months after its establishment. It changed its name to the Finnish People's College and Theological Seminary in January 1904, a name change which reflected the institution's desire to serve both general educational and seminarian needs of the community. Money was raised to fund the school's purchase of a three story building  through the sale of shares of stock. A board of directors controlled the operations of the institution, which included both anti-socialist clerics and pro-socialist lay members of the church. In an intense economic and political environment, marked by labor strikes and the emergence of the Finnish Socialist Federation among the immigrant community, these factions vied for control of the school.

The students of the Finnish People's College and Theological Seminary resisted the school's educational regime, which imposed mandatory prayer while forbidding discussion of social issues. This led to a strike of the student body in the Fall of 1904, with all but two students walking out of a mandatory prayer meeting in protest. The director of the school, E.W. Saranen, subsequently resigned his post as a result of the students' action.

Establishment

With enrollment tailing off, the board of directors initially considered closing the school but found financial rescue through the sale of stock in the institution at the rate of $1.00 per share. Frustrated by the lack of advanced secular education in their own language, the Finnish Socialist Federation (FSF) became actively involved buying stock at the behest of board member Alex Halonen. By the fall of 1907 majority control of the stock of the Finnish People's College was firmly ensconced in Socialist hands. The Socialists then made use of their majority ownership to assert control over the composition of the school's board of directors.

As a reflection of the institution's shift to secular labor education a new name was chosen for the institution — Työväen Opisto (Workers' College), most commonly albeit clumsily rendered into English as Work People's College. K.L. Haataja served as director and instructor. Leo Laukki assumed leadership in 1908. The new labor school was launched with just 8 students during the initial year, with the student body growing in the 1910-11 academic year at over 100 students. The class of 1912-13 was
136 students, of whom 33 were women. To this was added another group of students who participated in coursework through postal correspondence.

The Finnish Socialist Federation agreed to take on Work People's College as its own institution at the group's 1908 convention. For the next several years ever member of the Federation paid an additional tax of $1.00 per year for support of the school in addition to their regular payment of monthly dues. The 1912 convention of the FSF voted to reduce this subsidy to 50 cents per member per year, at the same time adding its opinion that the school's curriculum should be tailored to the needs of future socialist and trade union activists rather than to a general course of study. The school also charged a tuition of its students, which included room and board. Students in the 1912-13 academic year paid $20 per month for tuition, room, and board, an amount which was hiked to $22 for the 1913-14 term of study.

Work People's College taught its students a mandatory preparatory program including economics, politics, history, and "socialist program and tactics." Students could then continue with more specialized coursework, including courses in bookkeeping, basic mathematics, and the Finnish and English languages. Others continued on the academic path to become socialist orators and party functionaries, studying Marxist theoretical works in English and Finnish.

A severe ideological split divided the Finnish Socialist movement during the middle years of the 1910s, with one part of the FSF staying with the Socialist Party of America and another more radical offshoot casting its lot with the syndicalist Industrial Workers of the World. Work People's College was retained by the later faction.

Work People's College was a resident labor college, housing its students on-site. Other similar schools included Brookwood Labor College at Katonah, New York and Commonwealth College of Mena, Arkansas.

Termination

There were roughly 30 students during the final year of operation in 1940-41.

One building of the former Work People's College still stands at 402 S. 88th Ave. West in Duluth and houses eleven apartments.

Legacy
Beginning in the summer of 2012, the Twin Cities General Membership Branch of the Industrial Workers of the World in partnership with IWWs from around the country restarted the Work People's College, hosting a 5-day retreat bringing together nearly 100 rank and file organizers from around North America.

Notable faculty and alumni
 Leo Laukki
 Amelia Milka Sablich
 Yrjö Sirola
 Fred Thompson
 August Wesley
 Niilo Wälläri

See also

 Highlander Folk School
 Tie Vapauteen
 Rand School of Social Science (1906)
 Work People's College (1907)
 Brookwood Labor College (1921)* New York Workers School (1923):
 New Workers School (1929) 
 Jefferson School of Social Science (1944)
 Highlander Research and Education Center (formerly Highlander Folk School) (1932)
 Commonwealth College (Arkansas) (1923-1940) 
 Southern Appalachian Labor School (since 1977)
 San Francisco Workers' School (1934)
 California Labor School (formerly Tom Mooney Labor School) (1942)
 Continuing education
 Los Angeles People's Education Center

Citations and references

Cited sources and further reading
 Richard J. Altenbaugh, Education for Struggle: The American Labor Colleges of the 1920s and 1930s. Philadelphia, PA: Temple University Press, 1990.
 Richard J. Altenbaugh, "Workers' Education as Counter Hegemony: The Educational Process at Work People's College, 1907-1941," Syracuse University.
 E.E. Cummins, "Workers' Education in the United States," Social Forces, vol. 14, no. 4 (May 1936), pp. 597–605. In JSTOR
 Gary Kaunonen, Challenge Accepted: A Finnish Immigrant Response to Industrial America in Michigan's Copper Country. East Lansing, MI: Michigan State University Press, 2010.
 Peter Kivisto, Immigrant Socialists in the United States: The Case of Finns and the Left. Rutherford, NJ: Farleigh Dickinson University Press, 1984.
 Auvo Kostiainen, "Work People's College: An American Immigrant Institution," Scandinavian Journal of History, vol. 5, issue 1-4 (1980), pp. 295–309.
 Douglas Ollila, Jr., The Emergence of Radical Industrial Unionism in the Finnish Socialist Movement. Turku, Finland: Institute of General History Publication, 1975.
 Douglas Ollila, Jr., "From Socialism to Industrial Unionism (IWW): Social Factors in the Emergence of Left-labor Radicalism Among Finnish Workers on the Mesabi, 1911-19," in Michael Karni, et al. (eds.), The Finnish Experience in the Western Great Lakes Region: New Perspectives. Turku, Finland: Institute for Migration, 1975.
 Douglas Ollila, Jr., A Time of Glory: Finnish-American Radical Industrial Unionism, 1914-1917. Turku, Finland: Institute of History Publication, 1977.
 Douglas Ollila, Jr., "The Work People's College: Immigrant Education for Adjustment and Solidarity," in Michael Karni and Douglas Ollila (eds.), For the Common Good. Superior, WI: Työmies Society, 1977.
 Saku Pinta, "Educate, Organize, Emancipate!: The Work People’s College and The Industrial Workers of the World," in Robert H. Howarth (ed.), Anarchist Pedagogies: Collective Actions, Theories, and Critical Reflections on Education. Oakland, CA: PM Press, 2012.

External links
 Finding aid for the Work People's College is available at the Immigration History Research Center Archives at the University of Minnesota.

Educational institutions established in 1907
1941 disestablishments in Minnesota
Labor schools
Industrial Workers of the World in Minnesota
Education in Duluth, Minnesota
Finnish-American history
Finnish-American culture in Minnesota
1907 establishments in Minnesota